This is a list of albums from the Japanese anime K-On!.

Theme songs

"Cagayake! Girls"

"Cagayake! Girls" is a single used as the opening theme for the first season of the anime K-ON!. Sung by Aki Toyosaki as Yui Hirasawa on vocals with Yōko Hikasa as Mio Akiyama, Satomi Satō as Ritsu Tainaka, and Minako Kotobuki as Tsumugi Kotobuki as backup, it was released on April 22, 2009 in Japan by Pony Canyon where it debuted at fourth in the rankings on the Oricon weekly singles chart, selling approximately 62,000 copies.

"Cagayake! Girls" – 4:13
"Happy!? Sorry!!" – 3:45
"Cagayake! Girls" (instrumental) – 4:13
"Happy!? Sorry!!" (instrumental) – 3:45

"Don't say "lazy""

"Don't say "lazy"" is a single used as the ending theme for the first season of the anime K-ON!. Sung by Yōko Hikasa as Mio Akiyama on vocals with Aki Toyosaki as Yui Hirasawa, Satomi Satō as Ritsu Tainaka, and Minako Kotobuki as Tsumugi Kotobuki as backup, it was released on April 22, 2009 in Japan by Pony Canyon where it debuted at second in the rankings on the Oricon weekly singles chart, selling 67,000 copies. It was also awarded the Best Theme Song at the 2009 (14th) Animation Kobe Awards.

"Don't say 'lazy'" – 4:27
"Sweet Bitter Beauty Song" – 4:21
"Don't say 'lazy'" (instrumental) – 4:27
"Sweet Bitter Beauty Song" (instrumental) – 4:21

"Go! Go! Maniac"

"Go! Go! Maniac" is a single used as the first opening theme for the second season of the anime K-ON!!. Sung by Aki Toyosaki as Yui Hirasawa, Yōko Hikasa as Mio Akiyama, Satomi Satō as Ritsu Tainaka, Minako Kotobuki as Tsumugi Kotobuki, and Ayana Taketatsu as Azusa Nakano, it was released on April 28, 2010 in Japan by Pony Canyon where it debuted at first in the rankings on the Oricon weekly singles chart, selling approximately 83,000 copies. "Go! Go! Maniac" became the first anime image song to ever top the singles chart and the band also became the first female vocalists to occupy the top two spots with "Listen!!" on the singles chart in 26 years since Seiko Matsuda in 1983. It also topped the Billboard Japan Hot 100.

"Go! Go! Maniac" – 4:11
"Genius...!?" – 4:29
"Go! Go! Maniac" (instrumental) – 4:10
"Genius...!?" (instrumental) – 4:26

"Listen!!"

"Listen!!" is a single used as the first ending theme for the second season of the anime K-ON!!. Sung by Aki Toyosaki as Yui Hirasawa, Yōko Hikasa as Mio Akiyama, Satomi Satō as Ritsu Tainaka, Minako Kotobuki as Tsumugi Kotobuki, and Ayana Taketatsu as Azusa Nakano, it was released on April 28, 2010 in Japan by Pony Canyon where it debuted at second in the rankings on the Oricon weekly singles chart, selling approximately 76,000 copies. It also placed second on the Japan Hot 100.

"Listen!!" – 3:47
"Our Magic" – 4:12
"Listen!!" (instrumental) – 3:46
"Our Magic" (instrumental) – 4:09

"Utauyo!! Miracle"

"Utauyo!! Miracle" is a single used as the second opening theme for the second season of the anime K-ON!!. Sung by Aki Toyosaki as Yui Hirasawa, Yōko Hikasa as Mio Akiyama, Satomi Satō as Ritsu Tainaka, Minako Kotobuki as Tsumugi Kotobuki and Ayana Taketatsu as Azusa Nakano, it was released on August 4, 2010 in Japan by Pony Canyon where it debuted at third in the rankings on the Oricon weekly singles chart, selling approximately 85,000 copies.

"Utauyo!! Miracle" – 4:02
 – 3:40
"Utauyo!! Miracle" (instrumental) – 4:01
 – 3:38

"No, Thank You!"

"No, Thank You!" is a single used as the second ending theme for the second season of the anime K-ON!!. Song by Aki Toyosaki as Yui Hirasawa, Yōko Hikasa as Mio Akiyama, Satomi Satō as Ritsu Tainaka, Minako Kotobuki as Tsumugi Kotobuki and Ayana Taketatsu as Azusa Nakano, it was released on August 4, 2010 in Japan by Pony Canyon where it debuted at second in the rankings on the Oricon weekly singles chart, selling approximately 87,000 copies, only being beaten by SMAP's single, "This is Love". The song’s name comes from all of the first letters of their name, T-ainaka Ritsu, H-irasawa Yui, A-kiyama Mio, N-akano Azusa and K-otobuki Tsumugi.

"No, Thank You!" – 4:17
"Girls in Wonderland" – 3:34
"No, Thank You!" (instrumental) – 4:16
"Girls in Wonderland" (instrumental) – 3:31

"Unmei♪wa♪Endless!"

"Unmei♪wa♪Endless!" is a single used as the opening theme for the K-ON! film. Song by Aki Toyosaki as Yui Hirasawa, Yōko Hikasa as Mio Akiyama, Satomi Satō as Ritsu Tainaka, Minako Kotobuki as Tsumugi Kotobuki and Ayana Taketatsu as Azusa Nakano, it was released on December 7, 2011 in Japan by Pony Canyon where it debuted at fifth in the rankings on the Oricon weekly singles chart.

"Unmei♪wa♪Endless!" – 3:52
"Ichiban Ippai" – 4:10
"Unmei♪wa♪Endless!" (instrumental) – 3:51
"Ichiban Ippai" (instrumental) – 4:06

"Singing!"

"Singing!" is a single used as the ending theme for the K-ON! film. Song by Aki Toyosaki as Yui Hirasawa, Yōko Hikasa as Mio Akiyama, Satomi Satō as Ritsu Tainaka, Minako Kotobuki as Tsumugi Kotobuki and Ayana Taketatsu as Azusa Nakano, it was released on December 7, 2011 in Japan by Pony Canyon where it debuted at fourth in the rankings on the Oricon weekly singles chart.

"Singing!" – 3:54
"Ohayou, Mata Ashita" – 4:55
"Singing!" (instrumental) – 3:52
"Ohayou, Mata Ashita" (instrumental) – 4:50

Insert songs

"Fuwa Fuwa Time"

 is performed by Aki Toyosaki as Yui Hirasawa, Yōko Hikasa as Mio Akiyama, Satomi Satō as Ritsu Tainaka, and Minako Kotobuki as Tsumugi Kotobuki.

 – 3:59
 – 3:24
 – 3:59
 – 3:24
 – 4:01
 – 4:01
 – 4:01
 – 4:00

"Pure Pure Heart"

 is performed by Aki Toyosaki as Yui Hirasawa, Yōko Hikasa as Mio Akiyama, Satomi Satō as Ritsu Tainaka, Minako Kotobuki as Tsumugi Kotobuki, and Ayana Taketatsu as Azusa Nakano.

 – 4:36
 – 2:57
 – 4:35
 – 2:58
 – 4:36
 – 4:36
  – 4:36
 – 4:37
 – 4:34

"Gohan wa Okazu / U & I"

 / "U & I" is performed by Aki Toyosaki as Yui Hirasawa, Yōko Hikasa as Mio Akiyama, Satomi Satō as Ritsu Tainaka, Minako Kotobuki as Tsumugi Kotobuki and Ayana Taketatsu as Azusa Nakano.

 – 3:12
"U & I" – 4:36
 – 3:11
"U & I" (instrumental) – 4:36
 – 3:14
 – 3:14
 – 3:14
 – 3:14
 – 3:14
"U & I" (instrumental Guitar1) – 4:36
"U & I" (instrumental Guitar2) – 4:36
"U & I" (instrumental Keyboard) – 4:36
"U & I" (instrumental Bass) – 4:36
"U & I" (instrumental Drums) – 4:33

Albums and mini albums

Ho-kago Tea Time

 is a mini album by Aki Toyosaki as Yui Hirasawa, Yōko Hikasa as Mio Akiyama, Satomi Satō as Ritsu Tainaka, Minako Kotobuki as Tsumugi Kotobuki, and Ayana Taketatsu as Azusa Nakano.

Disc 1 (Studio mix)
"カレーのちライス" – 3:16 (Curry Nochi Rice)
"わたしの恋はホッチキス" – 4:24 (Watashi no Koi wa Hotchkiss)
"ふでペン ～ボールペン～" – 3:57 (Fudepen ~Ballpen~)
"ふわふわ時間" – 3:56 (Fuwa Fuwa Time)

Disc 2 ("Live" mix)
"カレーのちライス" – 3:20
"わたしの恋はホッチキス" – 4:30
"ふでペン ～ボールペン～" – 4:00
"ふわふわ時間" – 4:05

Ho-kago Tea Time II

, pronounced Ho-kago Tea Time Second is an album by Aki Toyosaki as Yui Hirasawa, Yōko Hikasa as Mio Akiyama, Satomi Satō as Ritsu Tainaka, Minako Kotobuki as Tsumugi Kotobuki and Ayana Taketatsu as Azusa Nakano. Second disc is labelled as cassette mix. It's the recording that the members have done in anime (episode 23) and includes everything that was shown to be recorded. Initial copies also contained a cassette with the same recording. Track 4 on this disc also contains spoken word by Asami Sanada as Sawako Yamanaka.

Ho-kago Tea Time in Movie

, is a mini album with lead vocals by Aki Toyosaki as Yui Hirasawa, Yōko Hikasa as Mio Akiyama, Satomi Satō as Ritsu Tainaka, Minako Kotobuki as Tsumugi Kotobuki, and Asami Sanada as Sawako Yamanaka and backup vocals by Ayana Taketatsu as Azusa Nakano, and Yu Asakawa as Norimi Kawaguchi. First disc contains the insert songs from the movie by Ho-kago Tea Time. Second disc contains the insert song from the movie by Death Devil and its instrumental version.

Character song singles

Season 1

Yui Hirasawa

"Giita ni Kubittake" – 3:33
"Sunday Siesta" – 3:38
"Let's Go! (Yui Ver.)" – 4:11
"Giita ni Kubittake" (instrumental) – 3:34
"Sunday Siesta" (instrumental) – 3:38
"Let's Go!" (instrumental) – 4:41

Mio Akiyama

"Heart Goes Boom!!" – 3:36
"Hello Little Girl" – 4:42
"Let's Go! (Mio Ver.)" – 4:11
"Heart Goes Boom!!" (instrumental) – 3:36
"Hello Little Girl" (instrumental) – 4:43
"Let's Go!" (instrumental) – 4:10

Ritsu Tainaka

"Girly Storm Shissou Stick" – 3:34
"Mokojise Happy 100%" – 3:17
"Let's Go! (Ritsu Ver.)" – 4:11
"Girly Storm Shissou Stick" (instrumental) – 3:34
"Mokojise Happy 100%" (instrumental) – 3:15
"Let's Go!" (instrumental) – 4:10

Tsumugi Kotobuki

"Dear My Keys ～Kenban no Mahou～" – 3:34
"Humming Bird" – 3:17
"Let's Go! (Tsumugi Ver.)" – 4:11
"Dear My Keys ～Kenban no Mahou～" (instrumental) – 3:34
"Humming Bird" (instrumental) – 3:15
"Let's Go!" (instrumental) – 4:10

Azusa Nakano

"Jajauma Way To Go" – 4:29
"Watashi wa Watashi no Michi wo Iku" – 3:18
"Let's Go! (Azusa Ver.)" – 4:11
"Jajauma Way To Go" (instrumental) – 4:27
"Watashi wa Watashi no Michi wo Iku" (instrumental) – 3:17
"Let's Go!" (instrumental) – 4:09

Ui Hirasawa

"Lovely Sisters" – 4:36
"Oui! Ai Kotoba" – 4:00
"Lovely Sisters" (instrumental) – 4:36
"Oui! Ai Kotoba" (instrumental) – 3:58

Nodoka Manabe

"Coolly Hotty Tension Hi!!" – 3:54
"Prologue" – 4:36
"Coolly Hotty Tension Hi!!" (instrumental) – 3:53
"Prologue" (instrumental) – 4:34

Season 2

Yui Hirasawa

"Oh My Giita!!" – 4:14
"Shiawase Hiyori" – 3:45
"Come with Me!! (Yui Ver.)" – 3:34
"Oh My Giita!!" (instrumental) – 4:13
"Shiawase Hiyori" (instrumental) – 3:43
"Come with Me!!" (instrumental) – 3:32

Mio Akiyama

"Seishun Vibration" – 3:38
"Soukuu no Monologue" – 4:29
"Come with Me!! (Mio Ver.)" – 3:34
"Seishun Vibration" (instrumental) – 3:37
"Soukuu no Monologue" (instrumental) – 4:28
"Come with Me!!" (instrumental) – 3:32

Ritsu Tainaka

"Drumming Shining My Life" – 3:25
"Yuuzora a la Carte" – 4:08
"Come with Me!! (Ritsu Ver.)" – 3:34
"Drumming Shining My Life" (instrumental) – 3:25
"Yuuzora a la Carte" (instrumental) – 4:08
"Come with Me!!" (instrumental) – 3:32

Tsumugi Kotobuki

"Diary wa Fortissimo" – 3:54
"Yasei no Jounetsu" – 4:38
"Come with Me!! (Tsumugi Ver.)" – 3:34
"Diary wa Fortissimo" (instrumental) – 3:53
"Yasei no Jounetsu" (instrumental) – 4:37
"Come with Me!!" (instrumental) – 3:32

Azusa Nakano

"Over the Starlight" – 4:08
"Joyful Todays" – 3:10
"Come with Me!! (Azusa Ver.)" – 3:34
"Over the Starlight" (instrumental) – 4:08
"Joyful Todays" (instrumental) – 3:09
"Come with Me!!" (instrumental) – 3:32

Ui Hirasawa

"Uki Uki New! My Way" – 4:10
"Shiny GEMS" – 3:26
"Come with Me!! (Ui Ver.)" – 3:34
"Uki Uki New! My Way" (instrumental) – 4:09
"Shiny GEMS" (instrumental) – 3:26
"Come with Me!!" (instrumental) – 3:32

Nodoka Manabe

"Jump" – 4:00
"Hidamari Living" – 4:54
"Come with Me!! (Nodoka Ver.)" – 3:34
"Jump" (instrumental) – 3:59
"Hidamari Living" (instrumental) – 4:53
"Come with Me!!" (instrumental) – 3:32

Jun Suzuki

"Junjou Bomber!!" – 3:15
"Midnight Superstar" – 3:44
"Come with Me!! (Jun Ver.)" – 3:34
"Junjou Bomber!!" (instrumental) – 3:14
"Midnight Superstar" (instrumental) – 3:43
"Come with Me!!" (instrumental) – 3:32

Death Devil

"Maddy Candy"

"Maddy Candy" is performed by Asami Sanada as Sawako Yamanaka.

"Maddy Candy" – 4:45
"Hell The World" – 4:48
"Maddy Candy" (instrumental) – 4:45
"Hell The World" (instrumental) – 4:47

"Love"

 is performed by Asami Sanada as Sawako Yamanaka.

 – 4:29
"Genom" – 4:20
 – 4:29
"Genom" (instrumental) – 4:17

Soundtracks

K-On! Original Soundtrack

 is the first original soundtrack of the anime series K-On!. The album contains 36 instrumental songs that are used as background music during the first season of the anime. It was released on June 3, 2009 in Japan by Pony Canyon. The whole album was composed, arranged and recorded by Hajime Hyakkoku.

"Have Some tea?" – 1:49
"Morning Dew" – 1:45
"Isoge ya Isoge!" – 1:34
"Kawai Inbou" – 1:42
"2 Hiki no Koneko" – 1:34
"Ii Yumemite ne" – 1:48
"Cotton Candy" – 1:52
"Virtual Love" – 1:51
"Tanpopo Takkyuubin" – 1:40
"Ukkari-kun no Tameni" – 1:38
"Genki!" – 1:39
"Obaa-chan no Tansu" – 1:49
"The other Side of Evening Sun" – 1:49
"Dead Soldiers" – 1:45
"Hold on Your Love" – 1:57
"Falling Reinforced Concrete" – 1:50
"Small Flashing" – 1:39
"Kendama-kun" – 0:09
"Karui Joudan" – 1:38
"Crepe wa Ikaga" – 1:33
"Happy Languidness" – 1:38
"Emerald Green" – 1:34
"My Hometown Where it Snows" – 2:03
"Ginsekai no Asa" – 1:47
"Tea at the Night of Christmas" – 1:58
"Koneko no Ensou Kai" – 1:34
"Patrol of Stroll" – 1:39
"Doki Doki Friday Night" – 1:43
"Ringo...Ringo...Ringo Ame" – 1:47
"15sai no March" – 1:39
"Jajauma 3nin Musume" – 1:47
"Hesitation" – 1:59
"Pinch Daisuki!" – 1:45
"Dress ni Crepe wa Niawa nai" – 2:02
"Ano hi no Yume" – 1:44
"Happy End" – 1:39

References

External links
List of K-On! albums on TBS 

K-On!
K-On